The Catinat class comprised two protected cruisers of the French Navy built in the early 1890s; the two ships were  and . They were ordered as part of a naval construction program directed at France's rivals, Italy and Germany, particularly after Italy made progress in modernizing its own fleet. The plan was also intended to remedy a deficiency in cruisers that had been revealed during training exercises in the 1880s. As such, the Catinat-class cruisers were intended to operate as fleet scouts and in the French colonial empire.

Catinat served briefly with the Northern Squadron in 1898 and 1899 before being placed in reserve; thereafter, she and Protet served the entirety of their active careers abroad. Protet was sent to the Pacific in 1899 after being completed, and she remained there through 1905 to protect French interests. Catinat was sent on a brief stint to French Madagascar in 1901 through at least 1902, before returning to France at some point before 1905. Early that year, she was sent to the Pacific to replace her sister ship, remaining there through at least 1908. No records of her activities thereafter survive. That year, Protet was converted into a training ship for the Gunnery School, though she was sold for scrap in 1910. Catinat was discarded the following year.

Background

These developments provoked a strong response in the French press. The Budget Committee in the French Chamber of Deputies began to press for a "two-power standard" in 1888, which would see the French fleet enlarged to equal the combined Italian and German fleets, then France's two main rivals on the continent. This initially came to nothing, as the supporters of the  doctrine called for a fleet largely based on squadrons of torpedo boats to defend the French coasts rather than an expensive fleet of ironclads. This view had significant support in the Chamber of Deputies.

The next year, a war scare with Italy led to further outcry to strengthen the fleet. To compound matters, the visit of a German squadron of four ironclads to Italy confirmed French concerns of a combined Italo-German fleet that would dramatically outnumber their own. Training exercises held in France that year demonstrated that the slower French fleet would be unable to prevent the faster Italian squadron from bombarding the French coast at will, in part because it lacked enough cruisers (and doctrine to use them) to scout for the enemy ships. To correct the weaknesses of the French fleet, on 22 November 1890, the Superior Council authorized a new construction program directed not at simple parity with the Italian and German fleets, but numerical superiority. In addition to twenty-four new battleships, a total of seventy cruisers were to be built for use in home waters and overseas in the French colonial empire. The Catinat class were ordered to as part of the program, and they were intended to operate in France's overseas colonies.

Design

To meet the requirements for new cruisers for overseas deployments, the French naval minister, Édouard Barbey, issued a request on 4 November 1890 for design proposals similar to the older  and es. Armament was set at four  guns and ten  guns, and the ship was to be protected by deck consisting of a pair of  layers. The new ships were to incorporate a barque sailing rig for extended voyages overseas. Barbey approved their recommendations and requested proposals from several shipyards on 3 February 1891.

Five yards submitted proposals, and on 31 July the  examined the submissions. Tissier had noted that the specifications issued by Barbey were broadly similar to the earlier s, so he based his design on those vessels. He widened the hull slightly and added a layer of wood to the copper sheathing to protect the vessel during lengthy deployments overseas, where shipyard facilities were not readily available. The  requested that Tissier replace the Lagrafel et d'Allest water-tube boilers with Belleville boilers, which would improve the arrangement of the boiler rooms.

In his revised design, which he had completed by January 1893, Tissier altered the arrangement of the main battery to more closely resemble the  design; he had originally placed the guns in sponsons that were widely spaced, but the  preferred the closer arrangement that  had adopted. Final approval from the naval command was given on 21 July; the first ship, was to be allocated to the 1893 budget, but delays forced her contract to be moved to the 1894 budget.

General characteristics and machinery

The ships of the Catinat class differed slightly in dimensions. Catinat displaced , while  displaced . Protet suffered from stability problems and had to have ballast added, accounting for her greater displacement.

Like most French warships of the period, the Catinat-class cruisers' hulls had a pronounced ram bow, tumblehome shape, and a short forecastle deck. Below the waterline, the hulls were covered in a layer of wood and copper sheathing to protect them from biofouling on long voyages overseas. The ships had a minimal superstructure, consisting primarily of a small conning tower and a bridge. They were originally to have been fitted with heavy military masts, but during construction, these were replaced with lighter pole masts with spotting tops for observation and signaling purposes. The ships were fitted with four searchlights. Their crew numbered 399 officers and enlisted men.

The ships' propulsion system consisted of a pair of vertical triple-expansion steam engines driving two screw propellers. Steam was provided by sixteen coal-burning Belleville-type water-tube boilers that were ducted into two funnels.

Armament and armor

The Catinat-class vessels were armed with a main battery of four  Modèle 1893 45-caliber guns. They were placed in pairs in a single large sponson amidships, two guns per broadside.

The main battery was supported by a secondary battery of ten  45-cal. Modèle 1891 guns (Protet carried the newer M1893 variant), which were carried in a variety of mounts. Two guns fitted with gun shields were placed side-by-side in pivot mounts on the upper deck, four more were in the upper deck forward in casemates. Another pair of guns were in sponsons further aft, and the remaining pair were in pivot mounts on the upper deck aft.

For close-range defense against torpedo boats, they carried ten  40-cal. M1885 Hotchkiss guns and four  20-cal. M1885 guns, all in individual pivot mounts. They were also armed with two  torpedo tubes in their hulls above the waterline, one per broadside. In addition, they carried a pair of  16-cal. M1881 field guns that could be sent ashore with a landing party. They had a capacity to carry fifty naval mines, which were stored in the compartment for the steering engine. A rail extended aft, through the captain's cabin, to a port in the stern, where the mines could be dropped into the ships' wake.

Above the deck, a cellular layer of watertight compartments was intended to contain flooding below the waterline. Catinat had  steel plating on the conning tower, while Protet received .

Construction

Service history

Catinat was assigned to the Northern Squadron in 1898, where she conducted training exercises with the rest of the unit. During maneuvers that year, she accidentally ran aground, but was not seriously damaged in the incident. She served in the unit for less than a year before being transferred to the reserve fleet. Protet was sent to the Pacific Ocean for a lengthy deployment after her completion in 1899. She helped suppress a fire in the United States in 1900 and protected French interests in Colombia during a conflict in the country in 1901. Catinat had been recommissioned and sent abroad by 1901, being stationed in French Madagascar. She operated there at least through 1902.

At some point thereafter, Catinat was recalled home and decommissioned once more. From 1903 to 1905, she lay at Lorient, where she was "completely abandoned". In early 1905, she was recommissioned to relieve Protet, which had also been recalled home that year. After arriving in France, it was determined that Protets boilers were in poor condition, but repairs were deemed to be too expensive. She was converted into a training ship for gun crews at the Gunnery School in 1908, but served in that capacity for just two years. She was struck from the naval register in 1910 and thereafter broken up. Catinats career in the Pacific was uneventful, and she remained on station in the region through 1908. She was placed in reserve in July 1909, struck in 1910, and followed her sister ship to the breakers' yard in 1911.

Footnotes

Notes

Citations

References

 
 
 
 
 
 
 
 
 
 
 
 
 
 
 
 

 
Cruiser classes
Ships built in France
Ship classes of the French Navy